Shooting at the 1972 Summer Olympics in Munich comprised eight events. The running target event was re-added to the programme, after last appearing in 1956. The events were held between 27 August and 2 September 1972. All events were mixed, meaning both men and women were allowed to compete in the same events, against each other.  Four women competed in these games.

Events

Participating nations
A total of 397 shooters, 393 men and 4 women, from 71 nations competed at the Munich Games:

Medal count

References

External links
Official Olympic Report

 
1972
1972 Summer Olympics events
Olympics
Shooting competitions in West Germany